Moselopteridae are an extinct family of eurypterids. It is the only family classified as part of the superfamily Moselopteroidea, and contains three genera: Moselopterus, Stoermeropterus and Vinetopterus.

See also 
 List of eurypterids

References 

Eurypterina
Devonian animals
Silurian animals
Prehistoric arthropod families